Negoești may refer to several villages in Romania:

 Negoești, a village in Șoldanu Commune, Călărași County
 Negoești, a village in the town of Baia de Aramă, Mehedinți County

See also 

 Negoiești (disambiguation)